Pseudoneaveia is a genus of butterflies in the family Lycaenidae, endemic to the Afrotropical realm. It consists of only one species, Pseudoneaveia jacksoni, which is found in the Republic of the Congo.

References

Endemic fauna of the Republic of the Congo
Poritiinae
Monotypic butterfly genera
Lycaenidae genera